The Tripartite Indenture was an agreement made in February 1405 among Owain Glyndŵr, Edmund Mortimer, and Henry Percy, 1st Earl of Northumberland, agreeing to divide England and Wales up among them at the expense of Henry IV. Glyndŵr was to be given Wales, and a substantial part of the west of England, including the English portions of the Welsh Marches. Northumberland was to have received the north, as well as Northamptonshire, Norfolk, Warwickshire, and Leicestershire. The Mortimers were to have received the rest of southern England.

The agreement defined Glyndŵr's borders as follows:

A village called Six Ashes still exists to this day on the Shropshire/Staffordshire border.

See also
 Tripartite Indenture and the Year of the French

References

1405 in England 
1405 in Wales 
15th century in England
15th century in Wales
1400s treaties
Partition (politics)
Glyndŵr Rising